The Legacy Virus is a fictional plague appearing in American comic books featuring the X-Men published by Marvel Comics. It first appeared in an eponymous storyline running through Marvel Comics titles from 1993 to 2001, during which it swept through the mutant population of the Marvel Universe, killing hundreds, as well as mutating so that it affected non-mutant humans as well.

Description
The Legacy Virus, contrary to the name, was actually a viroid and was released by Stryfe, a terrorist (and clone of Cable raised by Apocalypse) from approximately 2,000 years in the future. It originally existed in two forms, Legacy-1 and Legacy-2, but later mutated into a third form, Legacy-3; all were airborne agents.

Legacy-1 and Legacy-2 searched for a target organism's "X-factor," the sequence of mutant genes that gave a mutant their superpowers. If it did not find an activated X-factor in the target, the viroid would die off, leaving the person completely unaffected. If, however, it did detect the X-factor, it would begin inserting introns (non-coding DNA sequences, aka junk DNA) into the transcription codings of the victim's mutant RNA, the process commonly being triggered after the patient used their powers for the first time after contracting the disease. The result was a major compromise of the replication and transcription process so disruptive as to eventually render the body incapable of creating healthy cells, ultimately resulting in the death of the victim. Prior to death, the viroid causes its host's powers to flare out of control.

Legacy-1 attacked general transcription and replication of all cells, a messy and non-selective process that resulted in a condition akin to a fast-replicating cancer. This is the version that infected Illyana "Magik" Rasputin, sister of Piotr "Colossus" Rasputin.

Legacy-2 was much closer to Stryfe's original template and more in tune to his desire to stir a species war between non-mutant humans and mutants. Its attacks were selective, working only on the X-factor genes. The net result was that a victim would eventually lose control of his superhuman powers. In addition to developing at a far slower rate than Legacy-1, victims of Legacy-2 developed skin lesions, fever, cough and overall weakness (symptoms displayed by the telepathic X-Man Revanche). The slow nature of Legacy-2 is why St. John "Pyro" Allerdyce survived for years following his initial infection.

Legacy-3 was accidentally created in the body of the mutant woman Infectia. Her powers allowed her to scan and visualize the genetic structure of a living being, then alter it according to her own whims. When Infectia was infected with the Legacy-2 Virus, her powers caused a replication error that removed the viroid's conditioning to infect individuals only if the X-gene was present. Legacy-3 was capable of infecting any hominid.

The Legacy Virus is strongly suggested to be an allegory for the AIDS epidemic. Although all strains of the Legacy Virus were more dangerous than HIV, they shared similar symptoms such as skin lesions, fever, fatigue, and coughing. In addition, comics featuring the Legacy Virus illustrated the similar social impact of the further isolation of a stigmatized group.

History
The Legacy Virus first appeared in X-Force #18. It was based on a virus created by Apocalypse in the distant future, which was intended to kill the remaining non-mutants. At the time that this alternate version of Apocalypse was killed, the virus had not been perfected, and much like Legacy-3, it targeted all humans indiscriminately. As a result, this virus was never deployed, until Stryfe acquired it and altered it for his own purposes.

During the X-Cutioner's Song crossover, the villain Stryfe gave Mister Sinister a canister that he claimed contained 2,000 years worth of genetic material from the Summers bloodline. When Gordon Lefferts, a scientist working for Sinister, opened the canister after Stryfe was apparently killed by Cable, they found nothing inside. Far worse than that, the canister actually contained a plague, Stryfe's "legacy" to the world.

When Colossus' sister Illyana fell ill and died of the Legacy Virus in The Uncanny X-Men #303 (Aug. 1993), he left the X-Men and joined Magneto's Acolytes.

Eventually, reporter Trish Tilby, Beast's former lover, reported to the general public the existence of the Legacy Virus. Later, Xavier and Beast call a press conference to assuage fears in the general populace. While watching the press conference, Moira MacTaggert has an insight that the virus worked as a "designer gene".

The virus raged on for some time in the mutant population, until Mystique, in an effort to make the world safe for mutants, modified the virus to affect only humans. When Moira found out about this strain of the virus, she finally grasped what the key to the cure was. Unfortunately, she was mortally wounded by Mystique during the Brotherhood of Mutants' attack on Muir Island and did not live to complete the cure. Professor X did manage to telepathically retrieve the critical information before Moira died.

With this information, Beast was able to synthesize the cure a few weeks later, though one that had a price; the virus had first been released by the death of the first victim, and the release of the cure would have the same effect. Colossus, who did not want any more people to suffer his sister's fate, snuck into McCoy's lab and injected the cure into himself and activated his mutant powers, transforming his body into organic steel. This "supercharged" the Legacy cure, simultaneously killing him and stopping the spread of the Legacy virus, instantaneously curing even those dying of the virus at that moment (Although it was later revealed Colossus had been resurrected by alien technology and was being used as a test subject for an experimental formula that would reverse mutations before he was rescued by the X-Men).

Unfortunately, this rapid cure had unforeseen geopolitical effects. Thousands of Legacy-infected mutants had been quarantined on the island nation of Genosha, which was controlled by Magneto at the time. The instant cure gave Magneto a vast army overnight and allowed him to begin carrying out his plans for world conquest in the Eve of Destruction crossover.

In X-Factor vol. 3 #10, it was revealed that Singularity Investigations was creating a virus designed to kill mutants. While Jamie Madrox referred to this as the Legacy Virus, it is unclear whether Singularity is actually recreating Stryfe's virus, creating what is to later actually be Stryfe's virus, or merely engineering a new one with a similar purpose.

In X-Force #7, the Vanisher is seen to be in possession of a mutated strain of the Legacy Virus. It was later destroyed by Elixir in X-Force #10.

During the Skrull Invasion of Earth, Beast discovers that the Legacy Virus can infect Skrulls as well. Beast ponders whether to use it against the invading aliens. Cyclops decides to use it to get the Skrulls to surrender.

The Legacy Virus has returned once more as it turned out there were other samples that fell into the hands of Bastion. Samples have been injected into Beautiful Dreamer and Fever Pitch by the Leper Queen in order to cause their powers to go berserk and kill themselves and thousands of humans during an anti-mutant rally held by the Friends of Humanity. It was later revealed that Hellion and Surge were also injected with the Legacy Virus.

Dark Beast is also rumored to have a sample of the Legacy Virus.

Infection list
Listed below in alphabetical order are the characters infected by the Legacy Virus:

Other versions
The Ultimate Marvel universe version of the Legacy Virus is created by Nick Fury, in an attempt to replicate the Super Soldier experiment that created Captain America, using Beast's blood. The virus turns normal humans into super-strong beings, but is fatal to mutants, prompting Fury to hold Beast in S.H.I.E.L.D. custody to coerce him to find a cure for it, in the event that there is ever an outbreak.

In other media

Television
 In X-Men, a variation of the Legacy Virus was used in a brief storyline where it was the creation of Apocalypse, who had created the virus with the aid of Graydon Creed and the Friends of Humanity, infecting innocent people and claiming that mutants were the ones who had caused the plague. In an attempt to stop the plague, Bishop came back from the future to destroy Apocalypse's work before the virus could move on to mutants, but as a result vital antibodies that would allow the mutant race to survive future plagues were never created. Traveling back from even further in the future, Cable was able to come up with a compromise that allowed both Bishop's and his own missions to succeed; although the plague never made the jump to mutants on a large-scale basis, Cable nevertheless ensured that Wolverine would be infected, thus creating the necessary antibodies while not killing any mutants thanks to Wolverine's healing factor.

Film
 In Logan, a variation of the Legacy Virus is created by Zander Rice to wipe out the world's mutant population to avenge his father's death by Wolverine during the Weapon X program. By the year 2029, mutants are on the brink of extinction and Rice is working for Alkali-Transigen to engineer child mutants to be used as soldiers.

Video games
 In X-Men 2: Game Master's Legacy, the game's plot centers around the X-Men and the Legacy Virus.
 In the video game Marvel: Ultimate Alliance, a side mission includes saving a S.H.I.E.L.D. Omega Base Computer, which contains research data on the Legacy Virus. If the computer is saved, the data will be used to create a cure for the virus. If not, the Legacy Virus will become a plague that drives the mutant race nearly to extinction.

References

External links
 Legacy Virus at Marvel Wiki
 

X-Men
Fictional viruses
Fictional microorganisms
X-Men storylines
Viral outbreaks in comics